Rosé is a surname. Notable people with the name include:

 Alfred Rosé (1902–1975), Austrian composer and conductor
 Alma Rosé (1906–1944), Austrian violinist of Jewish descent
 Arnold Rosé (1863–1946), Romanian-born Austrian Jewish violinist
Carolyn Rosé, American computer scientist
 Eduard Rosé (1859–1943), German cellist and concert master.
 Joseph-Marie Rosé, French fencer
 Karlos Rosé, Dominican singer

See also
Rose (surname)